English Rose is a compilation album by British blues rock band Fleetwood Mac, released in December 1968.  It was originally a US-only compilation, combining six tracks from the UK release Mr. Wonderful, three UK non-album single sides, two not-yet-released songs from the UK version of Then Play On and one other previously unreleased track. It was released some months before the UK release of The Pious Bird of Good Omen, sharing four songs with that album. Mick Fleetwood appears in drag on the cover.

Track listing

Personnel
Peter Green – vocals, guitar, harmonica
Jeremy Spencer – vocals, slide guitar
Danny Kirwan – vocals, electric guitar
John McVie – bass guitar
Mick Fleetwood – drums
Mike Vernon – producer
M. Ross – engineer
Dinky Dawson – sound consultant

Charts
Album
Billboard (United States)

References

Fleetwood Mac compilation albums
1969 compilation albums
Albums produced by Mike Vernon (record producer)
Epic Records compilation albums